Broken Diamonds is a 2021 American drama film directed by Peter Sattler from a screenplay by Steve Waverly. It stars Ben Platt, Lola Kirke, Yvette Nicole Brown, Alphonso McAuley, and Lynda Boyd.

The film had its world premiere at the Santa Barbara International Film Festival on April 1, 2021. It was released on July 23, 2021, by FilmRise.

Premise
In the wake of his father's death, a twenty-something writer sees his dream of moving to Paris put in jeopardy when he's forced to temporarily take in his wildly unpredictable, mentally ill sister.

Cast
 Ben Platt as Scott
 Lola Kirke as Cindy
 Yvette Nicole Brown as Cookie
 Alphonso McAuley
 Lynda Boyd as Mom
 Chad Willett as Leeland Weaver
 Amanda Fix as Young Cindy
 Debs Howard as Julia

Production
In March 2018, it was announced Ben Platt had been cast in the film, which was originally titled Love and Oatmeal, with Peter Sattler directing from a screenplay by Steve Waverly. Molly Smith, Rachel Smith, Thad Luckinbill, Trent Luckinbill, and Trina Wyatt will produce the film, while Jon Schumacher will executive produce the film under their Black Label Media banner. In May 2018, Lola Kirke joined the cast of the film. In June 2018, Yvette Nicole Brown and Alphonso McAuley joined the cast of the film.

Filming
Principal photography began on June 4, 2018, in Vancouver.

Release
The film had its world premiere at the Santa Barbara International Film Festival on April 1, 2021. Prior to, FilmRise acquired global distribution rights to the film.

It was released on July 23, 2021.

References

External links

2021 films
2021 drama films
2021 independent films
American drama films
Black Label Media films
Films about mental health
Films shot in Vancouver
American independent films
Films scored by Keegan DeWitt
2020s English-language films
2020s American films